Omar Mijares (born April 22, 1938), is a retired Venezuelan professional wrestler, best known by his ring name Omar Atlas, who competed in North American and international promotions including the National Wrestling Alliance, Stampede Wrestling and the World Wrestling Federation from the late 1950s until the early 1990s. A longtime ally of Venezuelan wrestler Cyclone Negro, he was often billed as his younger half-brother Omar Negro when teaming with him in NWA Southwest Sports during the 1960s and later in Championship Wrestling from Florida during the 1970s.

He was also a popular star in Latin America wrestling as Super Steele in Mexico and Super Gladiator in Puerto Rico as well as Buddy Moreno in the southwestern United States.

Career
Born in Caracas, Venezuela, Mijares became involved in amateur wrestling as a youth and later competed and won a silver medal at the Pan-American Games in 1958. Traveling to Spain soon after, he began acting as a cornerman for friend and former olympian Cyclone Negro. Eventually persuaded by Negro to enter professional wrestling, he began training under Jene Howard in Barcelona before making his debut before the end of the year. Spending eight months in Spain, he eventually moved on to Colombia and spent the next four years wrestling throughout Latin America as well as returning to Spain from time to time.

In 1962, he was one of several South American wrestlers brought into Houston by Cyclone Negro and billed by promoter Morris Sigel as Cyclone Negro's storyline brother Omar Negro.

NWA
Leaving Houston a year later Mijares toured the United States with the National Wrestling Alliance wrestling in numerous regional territories including for promoters such as Paul Boesch, Sam Muchnick, Nick Gulas, Eddie Graham, Jim Crockett, Vince McMahon, Sr., Joe Blanchard and Carlos Colon. He would also become a leading star in San Francisco for Roy Shire, Don Owen's Pacific Northwest Wrestling and Bob Geigel's NWA Central States where he would remain one of the area's most popular stars throughout the 1970s. Feuding with NWA North American Tag Team Champions Yasu Fuji & Chati Yokouchi during early 1972, he and Danny Little Bear would twice capture the tag team titles before finally losing the titles to them in Wichita, Kansas on March 9, 1972. Several months later, he would also defeat Harley Race for the NWA Central States Heavyweight Championship in St. Joseph, Missouri on July 7 holding the title for half a year before losing to Roger Kirby in December.

By the 1970s, Mijares began competing in Canada feuding with Abdullah the Butcher and Harley Race in Calgary-based Stampede Wrestling as well as eventually winning the Stampede North American Heavyweight Championship from Gil Hayes on November 9, 1973. Enjoying a close relationship with promoter Stu Hart and the Hart family, he would spend the next 12 years between the World Wrestling Council in Puerto Rico and promoter NWA Central States in Kansas City, Missouri winning the NWA World Tag Team Championship with Pat O'Connor from The Interns (Joe Turner & Bill Bowman) in Kansas City, Kansas on August 29, 1974. He would also compete internationally, visiting Australia, Korea and Japan.

While in the Kansas City-area during the late 1970s, he would face Jesse Ventura in his debut match in Wichita. According to his autobiography, Ventura claimed that if he had impressed the crowd during their match, Mijares had been instructed to allow Ventura to throw him over the top rope so as Ventura would receive a disqualification. If not, he was to injure Ventura in a legitimate "shoot".

WWF
Mijares joined the World Wrestling Federation in 1984 as it began its national expansion under Vince McMahon, Jr. Although facing many of the promotions top stars such as the British Bulldog, Randy Savage, Honky Tonk Man, Jake Roberts and Ted DiBiase, he would be used primarily as a preliminary wrestler during his career in the WWF, Atlas continued competing for the WWF until the early 1990s.

Retirement
In 1993, Mijares retired from professional wrestling and eventually went into law enforcement as a probation officer. In recent years, Mijares works with convicts as a security monitor for the Bexar County Adult Probation Department in San Antonio, Texas.

In 2004, Mijares was honored by the Cauliflower Alley Club at their annual banquet in Las Vegas, Nevada.

In July 2016, Mijares was named part of a class action lawsuit filed against WWE which alleged that wrestlers incurred traumatic brain injuries during their tenure and that the company concealed the risks of injury. The suit is litigated by attorney Konstantine Kyros, who has been involved in a number of other lawsuits against WWE. The lawsuit was dismissed by US District Judge Vanessa Lynne Bryant in September 2018.

Championships and accomplishments
Cauliflower Alley Club
Other honoree (2004)
Central States Wrestling
NWA Central States Heavyweight Championship (1 time) 
NWA North American Tag Team Championship (Central States version) (2 times) - with Danny Little Bear 
NWA World Tag Team Championship (Central States version) (2 times) - with Pat O'Connor 
Championship Wrestling from Florida
NWA Florida Tag Team Championship (1 time) - with Cyclone Negro 
NWA Big Time Wrestling
NWA Texas Heavyweight Championship (1 time)
Pacific Northwest Wrestling
NWA Pacific Northwest Tag Team Championship (1 time) - with Nick Bockwinkel
Southwest Championship Wrestling
SCW Southwest Tag Team Championship (1 time) - with Bobby Jaggers
Stampede Wrestling
Stampede North American Heavyweight Championship (1 time) 
Texas All-Star Wrestling
TASW USA South American Championship (1 time)
World Wrestling Council
WWC Caribbean Tag Team Championship (1 time) - with Invader I
WWC North American Tag Team Championship (2 times) - with Invader I

References

External links
Profile at Online World of Wrestling

1938 births
Living people
Probation and parole officers
Sportspeople from Caracas
Venezuelan male professional wrestlers
Stampede Wrestling alumni
20th-century professional wrestlers
NWA Florida Tag Team Champions
Stampede Wrestling North American Heavyweight Champions